The Deal is a 2008 American satirical comedy film directed by Steven Schachter. The screenplay by Schachter and William H. Macy is based on the 1991 novel of the same title by Peter Lefcourt. Macy and Meg Ryan co-star.

The film was shot in Cape Town and other South African locations. It premiered at the 2008 Sundance Film Festival and was the opening night attraction at the Sarasota Film Festival. It also was shown at the Philadelphia Film Festival, the Maui Film Festival, and the Traverse City Film Festival, among others, but never was given a theatrical release in the United States. It was released on Region 1 DVD on January 20, 2009.

Plot
Struggling Hollywood film producer Charlie Berns is on the verge of suicide when his aspiring screenwriter nephew Lionel arrives from New Jersey with a script about 19th century British statesman Benjamin Disraeli. Charlie agrees to make the film, but only when he converts the literate PBS-style script (that he didn't read) into an action adventure Middle Eastern espionage film, Ben Disraeli: Freedom Fighter.

He casts power-star African American Bobby Mason, a recent convert to Judaism, in the title role and, after some creative wrangling with studio big-wigs and feisty project developer Deidre Hearn, whom he is instantly attracted to, he proceeds to set up production in South Africa. Charlie then lies to the studio, saying Bobby insists Deidre, who has purposely avoided Charlie, be sent to South Africa to assist on the production. She arrives, and she and Charlie eventually 'hook-up'. After Bobby is kidnapped by terrorists during the shoot, and the film is shut down, Deidre hatches a scheme to produce Lionel's original script 'on the Q.T.'. Using financing that must stay in Prague, Charlie and Deidre manage to film Lionel's original movie there, which goes on to receive seven Golden Globe nominations, making Charlie and Deidre the newest power couple producers in Hollywood.

Cast
 William H. Macy as Charlie Berns
 Meg Ryan as Deidre Hearn
 LL Cool J as Bobby Mason
 Elliott Gould as Rabbi Seth Gutterman
 Jason Ritter as Lionel Travitz
 Fiona Glascott as Fiona Hicks
 John Carson as Nigel Bland
 David Hunt as Grier Clark

Critical reception
In his review in Variety, Peter Debruge said, "The characters seem to be doing all the laughing, while the general public has nothing to cling to but the horndog flirtation between mismatched leads William H. Macy and Meg Ryan - hardly ideal ingredients for mainstream success . . . Elliott Gould gets laughs as the credit-hungry rabbi pulled in to consult on the film, although a few A-list celebrity cameos in the movie-star roles would have gone a long way toward completing the illusion."

Although Matt Prigge of the Philadelphia Weekly felt there was "nothing remotely original" about the film, he thought it "just happens to be sprightlier than most, zipping along from one familiar but well-deployed yuk to the next and anchored by the surprisingly winning team of Macy and Meg Ryan."

Michael Atkinson of the Boston Phoenix called the film a "bouncy, sharp-edged farce . . . [whose] target audience is, to some degree, its own cast and crew. Yet it’s difficult to resist when the purely idiotic is openly mocked by a sure-footed cast of line readers led by William H. Macy . . .  Meg Ryan gets a somewhat thankless role . . . but the dialogue is fast, and of course the target is a fat, awful, patronizing goldfish in a small bowl begging to be shot."

References

External links
 
 

2008 films
American comedy films
American satirical films
Films about filmmaking
Films based on American novels
Films directed by Steven Schachter
Films scored by Jeff Beal
Films shot in South Africa
2000s English-language films
2000s American films